Donald Edward Gerhardt (born March 31, 1944) was a Canadian football player who played for the Saskatchewan Roughriders, winning the Grey Cup with them in 1966. He played college football at Concordia College in Moorhead, Minnesota. After his retirement from football he was CEO of a health care trade association, Medical Alley/MNBIO and LifeScience Alley, living in Golden Valley, Minnesota.

References

1944 births
Saskatchewan Roughriders players
Living people
Canadian football defensive linemen
Players of American football from Minnesota
Concordia Cobbers football players
People from Ortonville, Minnesota